Vinod Mehra (13 February 1945 – 30 October 1990) was an Indian actor in Indian films. He started out as a child actor in the late 1950s before starting his film career as an adult in 1971. He acted in over 100 films from the 1970s through to his death at the age of 45 in 1990. He was also the producer and director of the film Gurudev which was released 3 years after his death.

Career
Mehra made his debut in the 1958 film Raagini as a child artist playing the younger version of the character played by Kishore Kumar. After playing a few more minor roles as a child, he started his film career as an adult in 1971 with Ek Thi Reeta, a smash hit based on the English play, A Girl Called Rita, along with Tanuja. He was one of finalists in the 1965 All India Talent Contest organised by United Producers and Filmfare from more than ten thousand contestants. He lost the contest to Rajesh Khanna and became male runner up of the contest. He was an executive with Goldfield Mercantile Company till the time he became runner up in the contest. He joined the film industry after being spotted by Roop K Shorey at Bombay’s Gaylord restaurant.

This was followed by the film Parde Ke Peechey opposite debutant Yogeeta Bali followed by Elaan (with Rekha), Amar Prem (1971) and Lal Patthar, though it was only Shakti Samanta's Anuraag (1973) with Moushumi Chatterjee, which established him as an actor. He went on to appear in over 100 films in a career spanning over two decades. He played lead roles in his earlier films. Later he mostly acted in multi-starrers as a secondary lead or played strong supporting roles such as a brother, friend, uncle, father and police officer. He worked with all top actors like Sunil Dutt, Dharmendra, Sanjeev Kumar, Rajesh Khanna and Amitabh Bachchan. His frequent female co-stars included Rekha, Moushumi Chatterjee, Yogeeta Bali, Shabana Azmi and Bindiya Goswami.

Some of his prominent films include Nagin, Jaani Dushman, Ghar, Swarg Narak, Kartavya, Saajan Bina Suhagan, Jurmana, Ek Hi Raasta, Ye Kaisa Insaaf Sweekar Kiya Maine and Khud-Daar. He received Filmfare Nominations as Best Supporting Actor for Anurodh (1977), Amar Deep (1979), and Bemisal (1982). He also played the leading role in a Punjabi film Maujaan Dubai Diyaan in 1985.

He turned producer and director with Gurudev in the late 1980s, starring Sridevi, Rishi Kapoor and Anil Kapoor in the lead. He died of a heart attack before completing the film, at the age of 45 in October 1990. The film was released in 1993 after director Raj Sippy completed the film. Many of his delayed films were released after his death and dedicated to his memory such as Patthar Ke Phool (1991 film), Insaniyat (1994) and Aurat Aurat Aurat (1996).

Vinod Mehra's daughter Soniya Mehra has acted in a couple films and son Rohan Mehra made his debut in Nikhil Advani's Baazaar in 2018.

Personal life and family
Vinod Mehra was born in Amritsar in 1945 in a Punjabi family. His father's name was Parameshwaridas Mehra and mother's name Kamala Mehra. Family shifted its base to Bombay from Amritsar after independence  as Parameshwaridas had business interest in Bombay. He had an elder sister named Sharda who appeared in several films before Mehra started his career in 1970s. Mehra completed his schooling in Sacred Heart Boys High School Santacruz and later earned a Bachelor's degree from St. Xavier's College, Mumbai.

Mehra was close to Rekha during the mid-70s. Indeed, they were widely believed to have been married, but in a 2004 television interview with Simi Garewal, Rekha denied having ever been married to him, and referred to him affectionately as a well-wisher (but in Rekha's biography The Untold Story by Yasser Usman, it is mentioned that Vinod Mehra, Rekha's rumoured husband, took her to his house in Bombay, after getting married in Calcutta, and Vinod's mother pushed the actress away when the latter tried to touch her feet)." Mehra's first marriage to Meena Broca was arranged by his mother. The marriage was reportedly not consummated as Vinod had a heart attack shortly after the marriage. After he recovered, he eloped with his frequent leading lady of the time, Bindiya Goswami. Meena was left with no choice but to file for divorce. Mehra's relationship with Bindiya unraveled quickly, and she soon left him to marry director J. P. Dutta. In 1988, Mehra married Kiran, daughter of a Kenya-based transport businessman. The marriage lasted until his death two years later and produced two children: a daughter named Soniya (born in 1988) and a son named Rohan (born posthumously). Mehra died of a heart attack on 30 October 1990. He was only 45 years of age.

After Mehra's death, his widow moved to Kenya, to live with her parents and sister. The children were raised in Mombasa and went to the UK for higher education. Both entered the film industry eventually. Soniya made her Hindi film debut in the 2007 film Victoria No. 203, a remake of the 1972 classic film of the same name. Rohan made his debut in Nikhil Advani's Baazaar (2018).

Filmography

Producer and director
 Gurudev (1993)

Actor

 Adl-E-Jehangir (1955) as Child Artist (Uncredited)
 Patit Pawan (1955)
 Sharada (1957) as Shekhar's Brother
 Duniya Rang Rangeeli (1957) as Street Singer
 Balyogi Upmanyu (1958)
 Raagini (1958) as Young Rajan (Uncredited)
 Bewaqoof (1960) as Young Kishore Kumar
 Angulimaal (1960) as Young Ahinsak
 Ek Thi Reeta (1971)
 Parde Ke Peechey (1971) as Rajan 
 Elaan (1971) as Naresh Kumar Saxena
 Lal Patthar (1971) as Shekhar
 Amar Prem (1971) as Nandkishore Sharma "Nandu"
 Anuraag (1971) as Rajesh
 Rani Mera Nam (1972) as CID Inspector Anand 
 Bees Saal Pahele (1972) as Story Listener 
 Bandgi (1972) as Darpan
 Kahani Hum Sab Ki (1973) as Prabhat
 Teen Chor (1973) as Mohan
 Nirdosh (1973) as Ravi
 Hifazat (1973) as Kishore
 Do Phool (1973) as Charitra Kumar Rai "Chuttan"
 Jurm Aur Sazaa (1974) as Ratan
 Aarop (1974) as Ravi
 Kunwara Baap (1974) as Vinod 
 Vada Tera Vada (1974) as Vinod
 Ujala Hi Ujala (1974) as Vikram
 Us Paar (1974) as Mohan
 Shaandaar (1974) as Chandar
 Hawas (1974) as Dr. Bali
 Faslah (1974) as Vinod 
 Chattan Singh (1974) as Vishal
 Albeli (1974) as Vikas Chandra Verma
 Vardaan (1975) as Mahesh Sharma
 Mazaaq (1975) as Vinod
 Umar Qaid (1975) as Vinod
 Raftaar (1975) as Vikram
 Do Jhoot (1975) as Sanjay
 Neelima (1975)
 Zindagi (1976) as Ajay
 Arjun Pandit (1976) as Tinu - Tina Shukla
 Nagin (1976) as Rajesh
 Sabse Bada Rupaiya (1976) as Amit Rai
 Ginny Aur Johnny (1976) as Mechanic
 Do Khiladi (1976) as Sawan
 Saal Solvan Chadya (1977) as Tony's Uncle
 Tinku (1977) as Rajendra Shah
 Jagriti (1977)
 Duniyadari (1977) as Prakash
 Khel Kismat Ka (1977) as Vinod
 Chaalu Mera Naam (1977) as CBI Officer Chandrashekhar / Raju
 Ooparwala Jane (1977)
 Kali Raat (1977) as Ashok
 Ek Hi Raasta (1977) as Nirmal
 Safed Jhooth (1977) as Vinod Thakur
 Anurodh (1977) as Shrikant
 Ab Kya Hoga (1977) as Kaka's Son (Uncredited)
 Saajan Bina Suhagan (1978) as Anand
 Ghar (1978) as Vikas Chandra
 Swarag Narak (1978) as Vinod
 Chowki No.11 (1978) as Vijay
 Chakravyuha (1978) as Raman
 Aakhri Kasam (1979) as Inspector Ram
 Kartavya (1979) as Ajay Rai / Dushyant
 Jurmana (1979) as Prem Prakash Trivedi
 Jaani Dushman (1979) as Police Inspector / Madman
 Bin Phere Hum Tere (1979) as Raju Sharma / Debu Sharma (Double Role)
 Raakhi Ki Saugandh (1979) as CID Inspector Shankar Verma
 Love in Canada (1979) as Dr. Amit
 Jaandar (1979) as Inspector Raj Kumar Verma "Raju"
 Dada (1979) as Moti / Jeetu
 Amar Deep (1979) as Kishan
 Atmaram (1979) as Madan
 Naya Bakra (1979) as Vinod
 Premikaa (1980) as Vinod
 Kashish (1980) as Mohan
 Badla Aur Balidan (1980) as Deepak
 Saboot (1980) as Vikas
 The Burning Train (1980) as Rakesh
 Takkar (1980) as Vinod / Boss (Double Role)
 Jyoti Bane Jwala (1980) as Inspector Arjun Bakshi
 Jwalamukhi (1980) as Vikram
 Pyaara Dushman (1980) as Inspector Amar
 Zakhmon Ke Nishan (1980)
 Yeh Kaisa Insaf (1980) as Ramnath Malhotra "Ram"
 Khoon Kharaba (1980) as Raju
 Saajan Ki Saheli (1981) as Anand
 Ye Rishta Na Tootay (1981) as Ram Kapoor
 Shama (1981) as Dargah Devotee
 Chehre Pe Chehra (1981) as David
 Sannata (1981) as CBI Officer (Special Appearance)
 Pyaasa Sawan (1981) as Jagannath 
 Gehra Zakham (1981) as Vijay
 Kahani Ek Chor Ki (1981) as Shyam / Vilaiti
 Sansani (1981) as Ajay Sachdev
 Professor Pyarelal (1981) as Professor Pyarelal
 Khoon Ki Takkar (1981) as Rajan
 Ustadi Ustad Se (1982) as Sanjay "Sonu"
 Bemisal (1982) as Dr. Prashant Chaturvedi
 Dial 100 (1982) as Gautam
 Khud-daar (1982) as Rajesh Shrivastav "Raja"
 Lakshmi (1982) as Mohan Saxena
 Shiv Charan (1982) as Charan
 Gopichand Jasoos (1982) as Jeetendra Verma 
 Sumbandh (1982) as Prakash Khanna
 Raakh Aur Chingari (1982) as Ashok
 Khush Naseeb (1982) as Vijay Sharma
 Dil Hi Dil Mein (1982) as Vijay Kumar Anand
 Sweekar Kiya Maine (1983) as Kishan Kumar Shukla
 Mehndi (1983) as Gautam
 Kanku Ni Kimat (1983)
 Prem Tapasya (1983) as Ashok
 Naukar Biwi Ka (1983) as Inspector Amarnath
 Shubh Kaamna (1983) as Mr. Mehra
 Laalach (1983) as Kishore
 Chor Police (1983) as Inspector Rohan Sinha 
 Yeh Desh (1984) as Salim
 Bindiya Chamkegi (1984) as Shyam Kapoor
 Dharm Aur Qanoon (1984) as Dr. Basheer Khan
 Jeene Nahi Doonga (1984) as Police Inspector
 Zakhmi Sher (1984) as Police Inspector
 All Rounder (1984) as Birju
 Aurat Ka Inteqam (1984) as Dinesh
 Pet Pyar Aur Paap (1984) as Vinod
 Mujhe Shaktee Do (1984) as Suraj
 Ek Naya Itihas (1984)
 Ram Tere Kitne Nam (1985) as Aloknath Gupta 
 Pyari Behna (1985) as Vinay Verma
 Sanjog (1985) as Narayan's Brother
 Shiva Ka Insaaf (1985) as Ram
 Maujaan Dubai Diyaan (1985) as Chandraprakash
 Ankahee (1985) as Doctor
 Jaal (1986) as Satpal Verma
 Aap Ke Sath (1986) as Ashok
 Mohabbat Ki Kasam (1986) as Dancer / Singer 
 Locket (1986) as Rajkumar Anil Pratap Singh / Raja
 Swati (1986) as Satyaprakash
 Aisa Pyar Kahan (1986) as Advocate Deepak Khanna
 Patton Ki Bazi (1986) as Inspector Vinod Saxena
 Inteqaam Ki Aag (1986) as Inspector Kishan
 Preeti (1986)
 Maqaar (1986) as Prashant / Jerry
 Samay Ki Dhaara (1986) as Dr. Vinod Kapoor
 Vishal (1987) as Dr. Tarak
 Pyar Ki Jeet (1987) as Dr. Anand
 Aag Hi Aag (1987) as Dr. Raghuveer Singh
 Satyamev Jayate (1987) as Inspector Mirza
 Aulad (1987) as Vikas "Vicky"
 Woh Milie Thi (1988) as Amar
 Waqt Ki Awaz (1988) as Dr. Shrikant
 Aakhri Adaalat (1988) as Barrister Shrikant Sharma
 Faisla (1988) as CID Inspector Ashok Verma / Bansi
 Mahaveera (1988) as Dharam 
 Namumkin (1988) as Shakti Kaul
 Saazish (1988) as Inspector Saxena
 Mar Mitenge (1988) as Inspector Thakur
 Bees Saal Baad (1988) as Inspector Verma
 Vardi (1989) as Police Commissioner Verma
 Meri Zabaan (1989) as Vikram Singh
 Eeshwar (1989) as Ramesh
 Prem Pratigyaa (1989) as Professor
 Shehzaade (1989) as Inspector Shankar Shrivastav 
 Mitti Aur Sona (1989) as Inspector Sunil
 Hum Intezaar Karenge (1989) as Ravi
 Zimmedaaar (1990) as Inspector Prakash Verma
 Pyar Ka Karz (1990) as Police Commissioner Arun Kumar
 Patthar Ke Phool (1991) as Inspector Vijay Verma
 Shikari (1991) as Chanchal's Father
 Kohraam (1991) as Masterji 
 Sarphira (1992) as Advocate Raj Kishan Sinha
 Policewala (1993) as Inspector Prabhakar
 Prateeksha (1993) as Tom D'Costa
 Insaniyat (1994) as Nandu
 Aurat Aurat Aurat (1996) as Vijay
 Aatank (1996) as Peter
 Aahat (2010)

Unreleased films
 Dam Maro Dam (1980)
 Barrister (1982)
 Chakma (1984)
 Kasme Rasme (1986) 
 Bonny (1993)

References

External links
 

Indian male film actors
Male actors in Hindi cinema
Hindi-language film directors
1945 births
1990 deaths
Male actors from Amritsar
20th-century Indian male actors
Film directors from Punjab, India
Film producers from Punjab, India
Hindi film producers
20th-century Indian film directors